Choaspes furcata, the hooked awlking, is a butterfly belonging to the family Hesperiidae.

Range
The hooked awlking ranges in India along the Himalayas from Kashmir to Nepal, Sikkim and Assam onto Myanmar and western China and possibly Borneo.

Status
William Harry Evans had considered this taxon as a subspecies of plateni and given its status in India as rare.

Notes

Cited references

See also
Coeliadinae
Hesperiidae
List of butterflies of India (Coeliadinae)
List of butterflies of India (Hesperiidae)

References
Print

Online

Brower, Andrew V. Z., (2007). Choaspes Moore 1881. Version 21 February 2007 (under construction). Page on genus Choaspes in The Tree of Life Web Project http://tolweb.org/.
.

Coeliadinae
Fauna of Pakistan
Butterflies of Asia